Gabriel Victor René Cognacq (9 October 1880, Paris – 7 June 1951, Seraincourt) was a French department store owner, art collector, and philanthropist.

Biography 
He was born into a modest family of commercial employees. After completing his basic education at the Collège Stanislas, he attended the École des Hautes Études Commerciales where, in 1904, he was awarded a Doctor of Law degree. As they were childless, they adopted Gabriel and made him their sole heir. In 1911, he married Jeanne Voelckel. They had one son; Philippe (1914–2012).

Following Ernest's death in 1928, Gabriel took over management of La Samaritaine and the Fondation.

Ernest and Marie-Louise had also amassed an important art collection. Much of it passed to the City of Paris. Since 1929 the collection, consisting mainly of 18th-century arts and crafts, has been on display at the  Musée Cognacq-Jay. More recent works, and the Asian handicrafts, were inherited by Gabriel. He soon made additions to the collection; including a large number of prints. During the 1930s, he supported other museums; purchasing property for the proposed Musée Bourdelle, and serving as President of the Musée Rodin. In 1938, he was elected to the Académie des Beaux-Arts, where he took Seat #6 in the "Unattached" section. He was also a member of numerous art societies, and was elected President of the Conseil des Musées Nationaux.

During the Spanish Civil War, he helped the Museo del Prado transport its collection to Geneva. In 1939, after the French declaration of war on Germany, he made the delivery vans at La Samaritaine available to the Louvre, to transport their collection to the relative safety of the Château de Chambord. He continued to support charitable causes throughout the war. When the Vichy government fell, he was accused of being a collaborator. The resulting public hostility led him to auction off his art collection, rather than donate it to the Louvre, as originally planned. The proceeds went to benefit the Fondation.

References

Further reading 
 Francis Rouget: "La Collection Gabriel Cognacq à la Galerie Charpentier", In: Le Monde, 30 April 1952
 Louis Hautecœur: Notice sur la vie et les travaux de Gabriel Cognacq. Académie des Beaux-Arts and Eds. Didot, Paris 1953

External links 
 Biographical references from the Comité des travaux historiques et scientifiques @ La France Savante

1880 births
1951 deaths
20th-century French businesspeople
20th-century French philanthropists
French art collectors
Members of the Académie des beaux-arts
Businesspeople from Paris